Joseph Harris Wright (born 26 February 1995) is a professional footballer who plays as a defender who plays for Scottish Premiership side Kilmarnock.

Club career

Huddersfield Town
Wright joined Huddersfield Town at under-16 level in September 2010, and signed his first professional contract with the club in 2013. Wright featured on the bench for the Terriers in February 2015, before securing a further one-year contract to keep him at the club until June 2016.

Accrington Stanley (loan)
In the summer of 2015, Wright signed for Accrington Stanley on loan until January 2016 and made his professional debut against Luton Town in August as a substitute for Adam Buxton.

On 5 January 2016, Wright's loan deal was extended until the end of the season.

Doncaster Rovers
Following the conclusion of the 2015–16 season, Wright joined recently relegated Football League Two side Doncaster Rovers.

Kilmarnock
After a trial at fellow Scottish Premiership side Hearts, Wright instead signed for Kilmarnock on a one-year deal.

International career
Wright has represented the Wales national under-21 football team.

Career statistics

References

External links
 

1995 births
Living people
People from Selby District
Footballers from North Yorkshire
Huddersfield Town A.F.C. players
Accrington Stanley F.C. players
Doncaster Rovers F.C. players
English Football League players
Association football defenders
Welsh footballers
Kilmarnock F.C. players
Scottish Professional Football League players